The 2021–22 Slovenian Second League season was the 31st edition of the Slovenian Second League. The season began on 30 July 2021 and ended on 21 May 2022.

Competition format
Each team played a total of 30 matches (15 home and 15 away). Teams played two matches against each other (1 home and 1 away).

Teams

League table

Standings

Results

Season statistics

Top goalscorers

Source: NZS

See also
2021–22 Slovenian Football Cup
2021–22 Slovenian PrvaLiga

References

External links
Official website 

Slovenian Second League seasons
2
Slovenia